Grete Ittlinger (14 April 1922 – 24 February 2004) was an Austrian swimmer. She competed in the women's 4 × 100 metre freestyle relay at the 1936 Summer Olympics. Ittlinger swam with Roma Wagner, Franziska Mally and Elli von Kropiwnicki and they failed to make the first three, and the finals, by coming last in the first semi-final. Ittlinger died on 24 February 2004, at the age of 81.

References

External links
 

1922 births
2004 deaths
Olympic swimmers of Austria
Swimmers at the 1936 Summer Olympics
Austrian female freestyle swimmers